Intravascular papillary endothelial hyperplasia is a rare, benign tumor.  It may mimic an angiosarcoma, with lesions that are red or purplish 5-mm to 5-cm papules and deep nodules on the head, neck, or upper extremities.

Pathology

Histopathology Images

See also 
 List of cutaneous conditions

References

External links 

Dermal and subcutaneous growths